175th meridian may refer to:

175th meridian east, a line of longitude east of the Greenwich Meridian
175th meridian west, a line of longitude west of the Greenwich Meridian